Loch Gorm Castle is a ruined castle located on Eilean Mòr (big island) on Loch Gorm, Islay, Scotland. It was once a stronghold of Clan Macdonald.

The castle was square, with a round bastion at each corner. The ruins, however, are heavily overgrown, and reduced to a low level, such that from the shoreline the island looks featureless.

In 1578, the castle was occupied temporarily by Sir Lachlan Mor Maclean of Duart, as part of his campaign to recover/seize the Rinns of Islay. He was ejected by the MacDonalds of Dunnyveg, with the assistance of the Colin Campbell, 6th Earl of Argyll (Lachlan's cousin). Ruinous from 1586, royal forces led by Andrew Stuart, 3rd Lord Ochiltree demolished the castle in 1608. Repaired afterwards, Ranald MacDonald of Smerby was in charge of the garrison of troops within Loch Gorm Castle and surrendered the castle to Sir John Campbell of Cawdor on 28 January 1615. Sir James MacDonald, 9th of Dunnyveg retook the island in April 1615 and left a garrison upon Eilean Mór. A private garrison was maintained upon Eilean Mór between 1639 and 1640.

References
 Islay Info Blog
 Site Record - Loch Gorm Castle - The Royal Commission on the Ancient and Historical Monuments of Scotland

External links 

Ruined castles in Argyll and Bute
Islay
Scheduled monuments in Scotland